The following is a list of people from Atchison County, Kansas.  The area includes the cities of Atchison, Effingham, Huron, Lancaster, Muscotah, and rural areas in the county.  Inclusion on the list should be reserved for notable people past and present who have resided in the county, either in cities or rural areas.

Academics
 Mary Peters Fieser, chemist
 James Bennett Griffin, archeologist
 Paul Christoph Mangelsdorf, botanist and agronomist known for research in corn
 Charles Lester Marlatt, entomologist
 John L. Pollock, philosopher known for influential work in epistemology, philosophical logic, cognitive science, and artificial intelligence

Arts and entertainment
 Carl Blair, artist
 Rory Lee Feek, country music singer
 Milo Hastings, writer
 Jesse Stone, rhythm and blues musician and songwriter whose influence spanned a wide range of genres and is credited to have done "more to develop the basic rock 'n' roll sound than anybody else"
 John Cameron Swayze, popular news commentator and game show panelist during the 1950s
 Frank Wilcox, character actor
 Max Yoho, humorist

Athletics
 Carter Elliott, shortstop in Major League Baseball for the Chicago Cubs
 Leslie Geary, designed and raced numerous competitive sailing vessels, and also designed commuter yachts, fishing boats, tugboats, and wooden hulled freighters
 Oscar Johnson, baseball player in the Negro leagues
 Joe Tinker, Major League Baseball player for the Chicago Cubs
 Larry Wilcox, head college football coach for the Benedictine Ravens

Aviation
 Amelia Earhart, aviation pioneer

Clergy
 C. I. Scofield, theologian, minister, and writer whose best-selling annotated Bible popularized futurism and dispensationalism among fundamentalist Christians

Journalism
 E. W. Howe, newspaper editor and novelist 
 Roy A. Roberts, managing editor, president, editor and general manager of The Kansas City Star; guided the paper during its influential period during the presidencies of Harry S. Truman and Dwight D. Eisenhower

Military
 Laura M. Cobb, former Chief Nurse of the United States Navy

Politics and government
 Willis J. Bailey, 16th Governor of Kansas
 William Thomas Bland, United States Representative from Missouri
 Charles F. Cochran, United States Representative from Missouri
 George Washington Glick, ninth Governor of Kansas
 Jerry Henry, member of the Kansas House of Representatives
 John James Ingalls, politician
 Sheffield Ingalls, politician and former Lieutenant Governor of Kansas
 James Edmund Jeffries, United States Representative from Kansas
 Victor Linley, member of the Wisconsin State Senate
 John Martin
 Chester L. Mize, United States Representative from Kansas
 Samuel C. Pomeroy, United States Senator from Kansas
 Jim Slattery, United States Representative from Kansas
 Benjamin Franklin Stringfellow, Missouri Attorney General, high-ranking border ruffian, one of the organizers of the Atchison, Topeka and Santa Fe Railroad

Other
 Bangs Sisters, mediums who made a career out of painting the dead, or "spirit portraits"

See also

 List of Benedictine Ravens head football coaches
 Lists of people from Kansas

References

Atchinson County